Talisay, officially the City of Talisay, is a 3rd class component city in the province of Cebu, Philippines. According to the 2020 census, it has a population of 263,048 people.

The name of Talisay is taken from the talisay tree which is abundant in the city.

History

Talisay was founded in 1648 as an estate owned by the Augustinians.  In 1849 it was converted into a municipality.

During both the American colonial period and World War II, Talisay served as a haven of colonial military forces. The municipality served as the center of guerrilla intelligence operations for the Philippine resistance movement in Cebu during World War II. The returning U. S. liberation forces landed on the beaches of Talisay on March 28, 1945, and were helped together with the Philippine Commonwealth forces and the Cebuano guerrillas, an event that marked the eventual surrender of Japanese forces on Cebu. That day is now an official holiday in the province of Cebu.

Cityhood

In 2000 the municipality of Talisay was converted into a city through Republic Act No. 8979. The municipality is now linked to Cebu City via the South Coastal Highway from Lawaan, opened in 2004. This brought some recent inward investment in the form of subdivisions, but some hastily planned plagued by problems. Conflict occurred between the residents of the mountain barangay of Maghaway and those of Crown Asia's Azienda Milan and Venezia subdivisions.

Geography
Primarily a residential and trading center, Talisay lies within the Metro Cebu area. It is bordered to the north by Cebu City, to the west is the city of Toledo, to the east is the Cebu Strait, and to the south is the town of Minglanilla.

Barangays

Talisay City is politically subdivided and comprises into 22 barangays:

Climate

Demographics

In 2017, Talisay City was the most densely populated city in the Cebu province. This ranking does not include highly urbanized cities: Cebu City, Lapu-Lapu, & Mandaue. There were 5,710 people living per square kilometer.

Cebuano is the predominant language of the inhabitants of the city (96%).

Religion

Talisay City has a Roman Catholic-majority population. It also has sizeable Protestant and non-Christian minorities.

Economy

Talisay remains an important center for the production of blasting caps used in dynamite.

Much of the commerce in Talisay takes place in the Tabunok area, where several public markets, strip malls and commercial establishments are situated. The biggest mall is Gaisano Grand Fiesta Mall Tabunok, which has a supermarket, department store and formerly, a cinema. However, much of the population still depend on the public markets, where they can find fresh meat, fish and vegetables, as well as other household needs. There are many sari-sari stores. Talisay City and the Tabunok area also serve as the commercial area for municipalities south of the city, being the southern gateway to Cebu City.

Culture

Talisay City is considered the "Lechon Capital of Cebu" and is considered one of the two places to get the best of the best Lechon, which is nicknamed "Inasal", in Cebu, with the other place being Carcar.

Because of their Lechon, the town decided to create a religious-cultural festival to promote Talisay City, which was "Halad Inasal Festival" and celebrated on October 15. The festival is in honor of St. Teresa of Avila, Talisay City's patron saint, and is highlighted by street dancing merged with a procession with roasted pig, which then culminates with a ritual showdown and a grand finale with a firework display.

Transport
Talisay City has benefited from the construction of the South Road Properties and the road that traverses it, the Cebu South Coastal Road, which is a 6-lane coastal highway from downtown Cebu City to the city's Barangay Lawa-an I, near its border with the town of Minglanilla, with several exits in between, many of which serve several areas of Talisay. Because of this highway, traffic, which has always been a problem for the inhabitants in the past few years for this area, has been greatly reduced, making the city a popular zone for housing once more, as it was in the early 70s and 80s.

The city is also set to be served by the Cebu Bus Rapid Transit, wherein it will have two (2) feeder lines, going to Mambaling and to the South Road Properties, both located in Cebu City.

In 2016, the Talisay city council expressed support for the proposed Light Rail Transit (LRT) project in Cebu.

Education
20 Elementary schools (Private & Public)
12 Public secondary schools
8 Private secondary schools
Divino Amore Academy (1993) Mohon, Talisay City
3 Colleges
5 Kindergartens
5 Seminaries

References

Sources

External links

 [ Philippine Standard Geographic Code]
 Talisay City Official Website

 
Cities in Cebu
Populated places established in 1849
1849 establishments in the Philippines
Cities in Metro Cebu
Component cities in the Philippines